Dávid Keresteš (born 4 September 1995) is a Slovak football midfielder who currently plays for 1. FC Tatran Prešov.

Club career

1. FC Tatran Prešov
Keresteš made his professional Fortuna Liga debut for Tatran Prešov against Ružomberok on 16 July 2016.

References

External links
 1. FC Tatran Prešov official club profile
 Fortuna Liga profile
 
 Eurofotbal profile
 Futbalnet profile

1995 births
Living people
Slovak footballers
Association football midfielders
1. FC Tatran Prešov players
Partizán Bardejov players
FC Košice (2018) players
Slovak Super Liga players
2. Liga (Slovakia) players